Urupsky District (Urup rayon;) is an administrative and a municipal district (raion), one of the ten in the Karachay-Cherkess Republic, Russia. It is located in the west of the republic. Its administrative center is the rural locality (a stanitsa) of Pregradnaya. As of the 2010 Census, the total population of the district was 24,404, with the population of Pregradnaya accounting for 30.6% of that number.

Administrative and municipal status
Within the framework of administrative divisions, Urupsky District is one of the ten in the Karachay-Cherkess Republic and has administrative jurisdiction over one urban-type settlement (Mednogorsky) and fifteen rural localities. As a municipal division, the district is incorporated as Urupsky Municipal District. The urban-type settlement of Mednogorsky is incorporated into an urban settlement, while the fifteen rural localities are incorporated into six rural settlements within the municipal district. The stanitsa of Pregradnaya serves as the administrative center of both the administrative and municipal district.

References

Notes

Sources

Districts of Karachay-Cherkessia
